Nespolo is a  (municipality) in the Province of Rieti in the Italian region of Lazio.

Nespolo borders the municipalities of  Carsoli and Collalto Sabino.

Nespolo is a rural community, with an economy originally based on farming and chestnut orchards, and has a population of 281.
The town sits on a mountain ridge and extends over a half circle shape. Its origins date back to the 14th century, somewhere between 1350 and 1400 when a number of scattered populations of the area joined together into a village proper, mainly for defense purpose.

The town church, built oh a high point between the two sections was founded in 1357 and renovated in 1521.

Since the high part of town is known as Castelluccio, it is possible that it may have been the site of a small castle likely built by the nearby lords of Collalto who presided over the territory.

References

Cities and towns in Lazio